Sir John Thynne (21 September 1555 – 21 November 1604) of Longleat House, Wiltshire, was an English landowner and Member of Parliament.

He was the eldest son of Sir John Thynne of Longleat and Christian, the daughter of Sir Richard Gresham, a London mercer and educated at Oxford University, graduating BA in 1573. He succeeded his father in 1580, inheriting Longleat House, which his father had built, and was knighted in 1603.

Life
He married Joan, the daughter of Sir Rowland Heyward, Lord Mayor of London, of Cripplegate, London, with whom he had two sons. 

He served as a Justice of the Peace in Wiltshire, Gloucestershire, Hampshire and Shropshire and was appointed High Sheriff of Wiltshire for 1593–94.

He was elected a Member (MP) of the Parliament of England for Heytesbury in 1584, 1586, 1593, 1597 and 1601, and for Wiltshire in 1589 and 1604.

After he and Joan took Caus Castle by force in 1591, Joan lived at Caus whilst John was based at Longleat. The letters between them illustrate their partnership. Joan appears to have managed many aspects of their estate.

In 1594 his son and heir Thomas, made a secret marriage to Maria Tuchet who was the daughter of George Tuchet, Lord Audley and Lucy Marvyn. This was the family of their enemies: Thomas's grandfather Sir John Thynne had a 15-year feud with Sir James Marvyn,  Maria's grandfather. Joan was involved with unsuccessful attempts for many years to get that marriage annulled. The story is said to have contributed to the inspiration for Shakespeare's Romeo and Juliet. The dispute over the marriage was resolved in 1601 and when her husband John died in 1604 Longleat went into the hands of her enemy Maria Thynne.

He was succeeded by his eldest son Thomas and his wife Maria Thynne.

References

 

1555 births
1604 deaths
Members of the Parliament of England (pre-1707) for Wiltshire
John
English MPs 1584–1585
English MPs 1586–1587
English MPs 1589
English MPs 1593
English MPs 1597–1598
English MPs 1601
English MPs 1604–1611
High Sheriffs of Wiltshire